The following outline is provided as an overview of and topical guide to the U.S. state of Ohio:

Ohio – seventh most populous of the 50 states of the United States of America. Ohio lies between the Ohio River and Lake Erie in the Midwestern United States.

The United States created the Territory Northwest of the River Ohio on July 13, 1787. Ohio joined the Union as the 17th state effective as of March 1, 1803.

General reference

 Names
 Common name: Ohio
 Pronunciation: 
 Official name: State of Ohio
 Abbreviations and name codes
 Postal symbol:  OH
 ISO 3166-2 code: US-OH
 Internet second-level domain: .oh.us
 Nicknames
 Buckeye State
 Birthplace of Aviation (currently used on license plates)
 Mother of Modern Presidents
 Adjectival: Ohio
 Demonyms: Ohioan, Buckeye

Geography of Ohio

Geography of Ohio
 Ohio is: a U.S. state, a federal state of the United States of America
 Location
 Northern hemisphere
 Western hemisphere
 Americas
 North America
 Anglo America
 Northern America
 United States of America
 Contiguous United States
 Central United States
 East North Central States
 Midwestern United States
 Great Lakes Region
 Population of Ohio: 11,536,504  (2010 U.S. Census)
 Area of Ohio:  
 Atlas of Ohio

Places in Ohio
 Historic places in Ohio
 National Historic Landmarks in Ohio
 National Register of Historic Places listings in Ohio
 Bridges on the National Register of Historic Places in Ohio
 National Natural Landmarks in Ohio
 National parks in Ohio
 State parks in Ohio

Environment of Ohio
 Climate of Ohio
 Protected areas in Ohio
 State forests of Ohio
 Superfund sites in Ohio
 Wildlife of Ohio
 Flora of Ohio
 Fauna of Ohio
 Birds of Ohio
 Mammals of Ohio

Natural geographic features of Ohio
 Lakes of Ohio
 Rivers of Ohio

Regions of Ohio
 Northwestern Ohio
 Southern Ohio
 Southeastern Ohio

Administrative divisions of Ohio

 The 88 counties of the state of Ohio
 Municipalities in Ohio
 Cities in Ohio
 State capital of Ohio: Columbus
 City nicknames in Ohio
 Sister cities in Ohio
Villages in Ohio
 Unincorporated communities in Ohio
 Townships in Ohio

Demography of Ohio

Demographics of Ohio

Government and politics of Ohio

Politics of Ohio
 Form of government: U.S. state government
 United States congressional delegations from Ohio
 Ohio State Capitol
 Elections in Ohio
 Electoral reform in Ohio
 Political party strength in Ohio

Branches of the government of Ohio

Government of Ohio

Executive branch of the government of Ohio
Governor of Ohio
Lieutenant Governor of Ohio
 Secretary of State of Ohio
 State Treasurer of Ohio
 State departments
 Ohio Department of Transportation

Legislative branch of the government of Ohio
 Ohio General Assembly (bicameral)
 Upper house: Ohio Senate
 Lower house: Ohio House of Representatives

Judicial branch of the government of Ohio

Courts of Ohio
 Supreme Court of Ohio

Law and order in Ohio

Law of Ohio
 Cannabis in Ohio
 Capital punishment  in Ohio
 Individuals executed in Ohio
 Constitution of Ohio
 Crime in Ohio
 Gun laws in Ohio
 Law enforcement in Ohio
 Law enforcement agencies in Ohio
 Same-sex marriage in Ohio

Military in Ohio
 Ohio Air National Guard
 Ohio Army National Guard

History of Ohio

History of Ohio

History of Ohio, by period 
 Prehistory of Ohio
Indigenous peoples
French colony of la Louisiane, 1699–1763
French and Indian War, 1754–1763
Treaty of Paris of 1763
British (though predominantly Francophone) Province of Quebec, (1763–1783)-1791
American Revolutionary War, April 19, 1775 – September 3, 1783
United States Declaration of Independence, July 4, 1776
Treaty of Paris, September 3, 1783
Unorganized territory of the United States, 1783–1787
Northwest Indian War, 1785–1795
Battle of Fallen Timbers, 1794
Treaty of Greenville, 1795
Territory Northwest of the River Ohio, 1787–1803
The "first forty-eight" found Marietta as the first permanent settlement of the new United States in the Northwest Territory, April 7, 1788
Connecticut Western Reserve, 1776–1800
State of Ohio becomes 17th state admitted to the United States of America on March 1, 1803
War of 1812, June 18, 1812 – March 23, 1815
Battle of Lake Erie, 1813
Treaty of Ghent, December 24, 1814
William Henry Harrison becomes ninth President of the United States on March 4, 1841
American Civil War, April 12, 1861 – May 13, 1865
Ohio in the American Civil War
Morgan's Raid, June 11 – July 26, 1863
Ulysses S. Grant becomes 18th President of the United States on March 4, 1869
Rutherford B. Hayes becomes 19th President of the United States on March 4, 1877
James A. Garfield becomes 20th President of the United States on March 4, 1881
Benjamin Harrison becomes 23rd President of the United States on March 4, 1889
William McKinley becomes 25th President of the United States on March 4, 1897
William Howard Taft becomes 27th President of the United States on March 4, 1909
Warren G. Harding becomes 29th President of the United States on March 4, 1921
Cuyahoga Valley National Park established on October 11, 2000

History of Ohio, by region

By municipality 
 History of Cincinnati
 History of Cleveland
 History of Columbus, Ohio
 History of Kent, Ohio

By county 
 History of Allen County
 History of Belmont County
 History of Butler County
 History of Carroll County
 History of Clermont County
 History of Clinton County
 History of Columbiana County
 History of Cuyahoga County

History of Ohio, by subject 

 History of the Jews in Ohio
 History of the Ohio State University
 History of Ohio State Buckeyes football
 History of Ohio Wesleyan University
 Ohio Academy of History

Culture of Ohio
 Cuisine of Ohio
 Museums in Ohio
 Religion in Ohio
 Episcopal Diocese of Ohio
 Scouting in Ohio
 State symbols of Ohio
 Flag of the state of Ohio 
 Great Seal of the State of Ohio

Arts in Ohio 
 Music of Ohio
 Theater in Ohio

Sports in Ohio 

Sports in Ohio

Economy and infrastructure of Ohio

Economy of Ohio
 Communications in Ohio
 Newspapers in Ohio
 Radio stations in Ohio
 Television stations in Ohio
 Energy in Ohio
 Wind power in Ohio
 Health care in Ohio
 Hospitals in Ohio
 Transportation in Ohio
 Airports in Ohio
 Roads in Ohio
 U.S. Highways in Ohio
 Interstate Highways in Ohio
 State highways in Ohio
 Rail Stations in Ohio
 Cleveland's Rail Transit System

Education in Ohio

Education in Ohio
 Schools in Ohio
School districts in Ohio
 High schools in Ohio
 Colleges and universities in Ohio
Case Western Reserve University
 Kent State University
 Miami University
 Ohio University
 Ohio State University
 Bowling Green State University
 The University of Toledo
 University of Cincinnati

See also

Topic overview:
Ohio

Index of Ohio-related articles

References

External links 

Ohio
Ohio